Melanohalea tahltan is a species of foliose lichen in the family Parmeliaceae. It was described as a new species in 2016. The species named honours the indigenous Tahltan people that live in northern regions of the Canadian province British Columbia.

The type was found along the Cassiar Highway, south of Kinaskan Lake, where it was growing on the bark of Salix. It has also been found in Thompson Plateau in southern British Columbia. Melanohalea tahltan is morphologically similar to Melanohalea multispora, but is genetically distinct from that species.

References

tahltan
Lichen species
Lichens described in 2016
Lichens of Western Canada
Taxa named by Helge Thorsten Lumbsch
Taxa named by Ana Crespo
Taxa named by Pradeep Kumar Divakar
Fungi without expected TNC conservation status